Longpont is a commune in the Aisne department in Hauts-de-France in northern France. It is around 13 km southwest of Soissons, and around 75 km northeast of Paris. As at 2018 it has a population of 255. The former Longpont Abbey is situated in the commune.

On 8 January 2015 the town was locked down in the search for the suspects in the Charlie Hebdo shooting.

Population

See also
 List of medieval bridges in France
 Communes of the Aisne department

References

Communes of Aisne
Aisne communes articles needing translation from French Wikipedia